The 24 Hour Woman  is a 1999 film directed and co-written by Nancy Savoca.  The film was shot on location in New York City.

Taglines
"A story about getting everything you want and what comes next."

Plot

Grace (Rosie Perez) struggles to be both a successful television producer and mother.

Principal cast

Critical reception
Janet Maslin of The New York Times found the film's depiction of working women to be genuine but overall did not think highly of the film:

However, Roger Ebert of the Chicago Sun-Times enjoyed the film and rated it 3 stars out of his 4 star rating system and overall thought it was a pleasant experience:

References

External links 
 
 
 

1999 films
American independent films
Artisan Entertainment films
Films set in New York City
Films shot in New York City
American pregnancy films
1999 independent films
Films directed by Nancy Savoca
1990s pregnancy films
1990s English-language films
1990s American films